Guy Back (born 7 December 1959) is a retired Luxembourgian football striker.

References

1959 births
Living people
Luxembourgian footballers
FC Progrès Niederkorn players
Association football forwards
Luxembourg international footballers